Colin Brian Haselgrove (26 September 1926 – 27 May 1964) was an English mathematician who is best known for his disproof of the Pólya conjecture in 1958.

Haselgrove was educated at Blundell's School and from there won a scholarship to King's College, Cambridge. He obtained his Ph.D., which was supervised by Albert Ingham, from Cambridge in 1956.

Personal life
Haselgrove was married to fellow mathematician Jenifer Haselgrove. After having suffered minor epileptic fits for several years caused by a brain tumor, he died in Manchester in May 1964.

References

External links
 

1926 births
1964 deaths
People educated at Blundell's School
20th-century English mathematicians
Number theorists
Deaths from brain cancer in England
Alumni of King's College, Cambridge